The 1975 Southern Miss Golden Eagles football team was an American football team that represented the University of Southern Mississippi as an independent during the 1975 NCAA Division I football season. In their first year under head coach Bobby Collins, the team compiled a 8–3 record.

Schedule

References

Southern Miss
Southern Miss Golden Eagles football seasons
Southern Miss Golden Eagles football